A pollinium (plural pollinia) is a coherent mass of pollen grains in a plant that are the product of only one anther, but are transferred, during pollination, as a single unit. This is regularly seen in plants such as orchids and many species of milkweeds (Asclepiadoideae). Usage of the term differs: in some orchids two masses of pollen are well attached to one another, but in other orchids there are two halves (with two separate viscidia) each of which is sometimes referred to as a pollinium.

Most orchids have waxy pollinia. These are connected to one or two elongate stipes, which in turn are attached to a sticky viscidium, a disc-shaped structure that sticks to a visiting insect.

Some orchid genera have mealy pollinia. These are tapering into a caudicle (stalk), attached to the viscidium. They extend into the middle section of the column.

The pollinarium is a collective term that means either (1) the complete set of pollinia from all the anthers of a flower, as in Asclepiadoideae,  (2) in Asclepiadoideae, a pair of pollinia and the parts that connect them (corpusculum and translator arms), or (3) in orchids, a pair of pollinia with two viscidia and the other connecting parts.

References 

Pollination
Plant anatomy
Orchid morphology